Karad South Assembly constituency of Maharashtra Vidhan Sabha is one of the constituencies located in the Satara district.

It is a part of the Satara (Lok Sabha constituency), along with five other assembly constituencies, viz Wai, Karad North, Koregaon, Satara and Patan from the Satara district.

Members of Legislative Assembly
As a constituency of Bombay State:

Key

Election results

See also

 List of constituencies of Maharashtra Legislative Assembly
 Karad

References

Assembly constituencies of Maharashtra
Karad